Drahomíra Miklošová (born 3 March 1953) is a Czech politician and a member of the Civic Democratic Party. She is a Mayor of Obrnice. She became widely known for successful integration of local Roma People. She was voted vice-chairwoman of the Civic Demcocratic Party in 2016. She remained in the position until January 2018.

References

1953 births
Living people
Civic Democratic Party (Czech Republic) mayors
21st-century Czech women politicians